The  San Jose SaberCats season was the team's 19th in San Jose, California. The team was coached by Darren Arbet and played their home games at the SAP Center at San Jose. They finished first in the Pacific Division with a 17–1 regular season record and went on to defeat the Jacksonville Sharks 68–47 in ArenaBowl XXVIII.

Season summary
The SaberCats, following a tough loss to the Arizona Rattlers in the 2014 National Conference Championship Game, made a number of key moves in the 2014–15 offseason. The most notable of these moves saw the SaberCats sign quarterback Erik Meyer, the 2013 AFL MVP, to replace outgoing quarterback Russ Michna. The team revamped its secondary with the signings of superstar cornerback Virgil Gray and promising young defensive back Eric Crocker; the team also traded with the Portland Thunder for defensive lineman Donte Paige-Moss, who ultimately filled in for outgoing free agent Joe Sykes. These players joined a strong defensive core of David Hyland, Ken Fontenette, Francis Maka, Luis Vasquez, and 2014 Defensive Player of the Year Jason Stewart.

In addition to signing Meyer, the SaberCats made a handful of key additions on offense. They greatly bolstered their receiving corps by signing 2014 All-Arena receiver Darius Reynolds and 2013 Receiver of the Year Adron Tennell (both of which were to fill the void left by the loss of Dominique Curry); these signings added to a group that included superstar wideout Reggie Gray and veteran Ben Nelson. The SaberCats also traded for experienced center Jeff Maddux and signed 2014 All-Arena offensive lineman Colin Madison; these players joined star linemen George Bussey and Rich Ranglin. The team also retained All-Arena fullback Odie Armstrong and 2014 Kicker of the Year Nich Pertuit.

The SaberCats began their season in Las Vegas, Nevada, where they cruised to a 59–41 victory. The SaberCats then won each of their next ten games, mostly in lopsided fashion; over that span, only one team (the Tampa Bay Storm) lost by single digits. The SaberCats played fantastic defense despite the Week 3 loss of Virgil Gray to injury; he was replaced by Hall of Fame cornerback (and SaberCats legend) Clevan Thomas. On June 7, following a Portland Thunder loss, the 11–0 SaberCats clinched their second consecutive (and tenth overall) division championship. This ensured that they would reach the postseason for the fourth consecutive season. 

The SaberCats' remarkable run ended one week later against the Los Angeles Kiss, who were 1–9 at the time. After forcing overtime on the final play of the fourth quarter, the SaberCats turned the ball over on downs; a subsequent Los Angeles score sealed a 48–42 loss. The SaberCats regrouped, winning their final six regular season games; their 17–1 record tied the 2014 Cleveland Gladiators for the best regular season finish in AFL history. The SaberCats triumphed despite losing George Bussey and Adron Tennell to injury; they replaced the players with center Antonio Narcisse and All-Arena wideout Maurice Purify, respectively. Numerous players received awards at the end of the season; most notable was Reggie Gray's selection as Wide Receiver of the Year. Gray finished the campaign with a franchise-record 44 receiving touchdowns.

In the first round of the playoffs, the SaberCats faced the Portland Thunder (who they crushed in a 55–28 rout). They then defeated their rivals, the three-time defending champion Arizona Rattlers, by the score of 70–67 in the Conference Championship game; the game was ultimately decided by a controversial call made with eight seconds left in the fourth quarter. The SaberCats proceeded to ArenaBowl XXVIII, where they faced off against the American Conference Champion Jacksonville Sharks; after a back-and-forth first half, the heavily favored SaberCats pulled away with 34 unanswered points in the third and fourth quarters (including two defensive touchdowns by David Hyland). The SaberCats won the game by the score of 68–47; in doing so, they became the only team in AFL history to win 20 games in a season. They joined the 2002 SaberCats as the only one-loss teams in league history.

The 2015 San Jose SaberCats posted, in many regards, the most dominant regular season in AFL history. They boasted the league's #1 offense and #1 defense; their point differential of +399 was the largest in league history. Similarly, the SaberCats averaged 22.17 more points per game than their opponents; this is the largest Margin of Victory (MOV) in AFL history. According to Arenafan.com, after accounting for league averages, the 2015 SaberCats' defense was the most dominant of all time.

Standings

Schedule

Regular season
The 2015 regular season schedule was released on December 19, 2014.

Playoffs

Roster

References

San Jose SaberCats
San Jose SaberCats seasons
San Jose SaberCats
ArenaBowl champion seasons